The Submillimeter Telescope (SMT), formerly known as the Heinrich Hertz Submillimeter Telescope, is a submillimeter wavelength radio telescope located on Mount Graham, Arizona, US. It is a 10-meter-wide parabolic dish inside a building to protect it from bad weather. The building front doors and roof are opened when the telescope is in use.  The telescope's construction was finished in 1993.  Along with the 12 Meter Telescope on Kitt Peak, this telescope is maintained by the Arizona Radio Observatory, a division of Steward Observatory at the University of Arizona.

The dryness of the air around and above Mount Graham is important for extremely high frequency (EHF) radio and far-infrared observations – a region of the spectrum where the electromagnetic waves are strongly attenuated by any water vapor or clouds in the air.

This telescope is used nine to ten months of the year, and it is stowed only when there is too much water vapor in the atmosphere, primarily during the summertime.  This telescope is one of the telescopes that make up Mount Graham International Observatory.

See also
 Mount Graham International Observatory
 James Clerk Maxwell Telescope submillimeter telescope at Mauna Kea Observatory
 List of observatories
 Lists of telescopes

References

External links
 
 Official website at the Arizona Radio Observatory
 Discovery Park – Guided MGIO tours for the public

Astronomical observatories in Arizona
Radio telescopes
Submillimetre telescopes
Buildings and structures in Graham County, Arizona
Pinaleño Mountains
University of Arizona
1993 establishments in Arizona
Heinrich Hertz